Constantin David may refer to:

Constantin David (activist) (1908–1941), Romanian political activist
Constantin David (boxer) (1912-?), Romanian boxer
Constantin J. David (1886–1964), German actor and director